(Hard to Say I Love You) was a Japanese television drama on Fuji TV which aired from April 15, 2010 to June 24, 2010.

Plot
This is a story about the blossoming friendship of five young people who were brought together by Twitter, and their journey to finding honesty with each other and with themselves.

Nakajima looks up to his father, who was a war photographer, but can only get a job as an assistant for gravure magazines. Mizuno is a provisional high school teacher, currently on probation. Nishimura is Mizuno's best friend, whose boyfriend has been avoiding her since she discovered she was pregnant. Ichihara works at a magazine where he is being blackmailed into sexual favours by his chief editor. Park, on Twitter, takes on the persona of a doctor, when he is actually working at a company that sells medical equipment to uninterested doctors, and at the same time, trying to take care of his younger sister.

Cast
Eita as Keisuke Nakajima/"Nakaji"
Juri Ueno as Tsukiko Mizuno/"Haru"
Megumi Seki as Hikaru Nishimura/"Peach"
Tetsuji Tamayama as Kaoru Ichihara/"Linda"
Kim Jaejoong as Park Seon-soo/"Doctor"
 Haruka Kinami as Park Min-ha
Yuichi Nakamura as Shu Mizuno
 Shogo Sakamoto as Kenta Matsujima
 Ryo Ryusei as Masafumi Takahashi
Rina Aizawa as Yuki Maeda
 Eri Watanabe as Mariko Okuda
Kenichi Yajima as Tomohiko Yamamoto
 Tetsushi Tanaka as Takashi Minehara
 Toshihide Tonesaku as Takafumi Shiraishi
 Mayumi Asaka as Misako Ichihara
 Haruka Igawa as Kiriko Yamamoto
 Jun Fubuki as Sachiko Mizuno

Ratings

Source: Video Research, Ltd.

Production credits
Screenwriter: Eriko Kitagawa
Directors: Mitsuno Michio and Nishisaka Mizuki

Fuji TV dramas
2010 Japanese television series debuts
2010 Japanese television series endings
Japanese drama television series